"Wake Up!" is a song by Japanese ska band Tokyo Ska Paradise Orchestra featuring rock band Asian Kung-Fu Generation. It was released as the 3rd part of Tokyo Ska Paradise Orchestra's 25th anniversary project 'Band Collaboration Trilogy' on July 2, 2014. Single's B-side include a cover of Nat Adderley's "Work Song" and "I Want To Be A Star Which Twinkles Only For You" which was composed by band's keyboardist, Yuichi Oki.

Music video
The video features all members of Tokyo Ska Paradise Orchestra and Asian Kung-Fu Generation. They playing the song in a set that looks like ballroom and pose in different background with Masafumi Gotoh as a center.

Track listing 
Lyrics for "Wake Up!" written by Atsushi Yanaka and Masafumi Gotoh.

Charts

Release history

References 

Tokyo Ska Paradise Orchestra songs
Asian Kung-Fu Generation songs
2014 singles
Songs written by Masafumi Gotoh